Rubial is the surname of the following people
Aitor Ruibal (born in 1996), Spanish footballer
Javier Ruibal (born in 1955), Spanish musician and songwriter
Jorge Ruibal (born in 1945), Uruguayan lawyer and judge
Víctor Manuel Liceaga Ruibal (1935–2012), Mexican politician
Xesús Ferro Ruibal (born in 1944), Spanish theologian and Latinist